The first Sarawak state election was held from Saturday, 10 May 1969 and scheduled to be completed on Saturday, 7 June 1969 which lasted for 4 weeks and was carried out in staggered basis. This was due to the lack of transportation and communication systems in the state at that time. The state election was held at the same time as the 1969 general election. The Dewan Rakyat of the Malaysian Parliament and all the state assemblies were dissolved on 20 March 1969, except for Kelantan (which dissolved later on 31 March) and Sabah (which were not up for election as it had held its state election in 1967). The nomination date was set on Saturday, 5 April 1969. However, because of the riot occurred during 13 May incident and the declaration of emergency and the promulgation of Emergency (Essential Powers) Ordinance No. 1 of 1969 on 15 May 1969, all the ongoing polls were suspended until 1970. During when the suspension was enforced, polling in 9 out of 48 constituencies in Sarawak had started. None of the elections in Sarawak was completed at that time.

Background

Prior to 1969 election, a political party was suspended from contesting in general election. The political party later mounted a public campaign calling the voters to boycott the election. The Sarawak parliamentary and state election was resumed from Saturday, 6 June 1970 to Saturday, 4 July 1970. During the resumption of the election, there was a tragedy in Sarikei in the third division of Sarawak on 29 June 1970. The communist terrorists had killed three election officials on their return journey after completing polling at a station. There was also an incident were a land mine was exploded outside the polling station in the same division.

This election saw 332,373 eligible voters after the first registration in Sarawak. Of these eligible voters, 26% were the Malays, 28 were the Chinese, and 46 percent were from Dayaks. The turn up rate of voters was 80.0%, which was considered high as compared to other states in Malaysia. A total of 221 candidates were contesting for 48 state seats in Sarawak. The breakdown of number of seats were:

 33 seats were contested by Sarawak Alliance (Perikatan Sarawak in Malay). It was made up of Parti Bumiputera Sarawak (BUMIPUTERA) and Sarawak Chinese Association (SCA)
 40 seats by Sarawak United Peoples' Party (SUPP)
 35 seats by Parti Pesaka Sarawak (Pesaka)
 47 seats by Sarawak National Party (SNAP)

There were 66 independent candidates vying for the seats.

Results

Summary 
SUPP later joined Sarawak Alliance to form a coalition government. This enable the coalition to secure a total of 27 out of 48 seats in the Sarawak Council Negri (now Sarawak State Legislative Assembly).

As a result of Parti Bumiputera-SCA alliance, SCA received majority of its votes from Malay voters.

Results by constituency 

The full list of representatives is shown below:

See also
 1969 Malaysian general election

References 

1969
1969 elections in Malaysia